, commonly known as  , was a Japanese historian and Sinologist. He was the founder of the Kyoto School of historiography, and along with Shiratori Kurakichi (the founder of the Tokyo School), was one of the leading Japanese historians of East Asia in the early twentieth century. His most well-known book is called Nara.

Biography 
He was born in what is today Akita Prefecture. He distinguished himself as a journalist. In 1907 he discovered Manwen Laodang in Mukden. As an authority of Chinese history, he was invited to Kyoto Imperial University by Kano Kokichi in 1907 and got involved in the foundation of the Department of Oriental History.

Naitō's most influential contribution to historiography was the recognition and analysis of the "Tang-Song transition" as an important watershed. He argued that the social, political, demographic and economic changes that occurred between the mid-Tang Dynasty and early Song Dynasty represented the transition between the medieval (chūsei) and early modern (kinsei) periods of Chinese history.

In Japanese history, Naitō argued that Yamataikoku was located in Kyūshū rather than in Kinki.

Further reading
 Fogel, Joshua A. Politics and Sinology: The Case of Naitō Konan (1866-1934). Harvard, 1984.
 Miyakawa, Hisayuki. "An Outline of the Naito Hypothesis and Its Effect on Japanese Studies of China." Far Eastern Quarterly 14.4 (1955):533-552.

References

1866 births
1934 deaths
People from Akita Prefecture
Japanese Japanologists
Japanese sinologists
Academic staff of Kyoto University
Japanese journalists
20th-century Japanese historians
Akita University alumni
Historians of Japan
Historians of China